John Wedgwood may refer to:

 John Wedgwood (1721–1767), merchant of London
 John Wedgwood (horticulturist) (1766–1844), founder of the Royal Horticultural Society and son of Josiah Wedgwood
 J. T. Wedgwood (John Taylor Wedgwood, 1782–1856), line engraver
 John Allen Wedgwood (1796–1882), usually known as Allen Wedgwood, vicar of Maer, Staffordshire
 Sir John Wedgwood, 2nd Baronet (1907–1989), British politician and industrialist
 John Wedgwood (doctor) (1919–2007), British physician